Sultan Mahmud Badaruddin II (1767–1852) was the 8th Sultan of the Palembang Sultanate and is now regarded as a National Hero of Indonesia. He is featured in pre-2016 Rp.10,000 banknotes.

See also
Masagus

References

1776 births
1852 deaths
People from Palembang
National Heroes of Indonesia
Indonesian people of Malay descent